The 2022 Schleswig-Holstein state election was held on 8 May 2022 to elect the 20th Landtag of Schleswig-Holstein. The outgoing government was a coalition of the Christian Democratic Union (CDU), The Greens, and the Free Democratic Party (FDP), led by Minister-President Daniel Günther.

The CDU won in a landslide, claiming 43% of the vote with a swing of over eleven percentage points and falling one seat short of an absolute majority in the Landtag. It is their best result since Uwe Barschel's 49 % showing in the 1983 state election. The opposition Social Democratic Party (SPD) suffered major losses and fell to third place with 16% of votes, its worst ever result in the state, while the Greens became the second-largest party with 18%. The FDP also declined to 6% and the Alternative for Germany (AfD) fell below the 5% electoral threshold, losing representation in a state parliament for the first time. The South Schleswig Voters' Association (SSW), which represents the Danish and Frisian minorities in Schleswig-Holstein, won 6%, their best result since the first post-war state election in 1947.

The CDU's victory was attributed to the personal popularity of Minister-President Günther, as well as the federal government's response to the 2022 Russian invasion of Ukraine, for which Chancellor Olaf Scholz has been criticised. In the lead-up to the election, Günther was the most popular Minister-President in Germany with an approval rating of 76%, and was preferred Minister-President even among opposition voters.

After the election, the CDU formed a coalition with the Greens. Daniel Günther was re-elected as Minister-President on 29 June.

Election date
The Landtag is elected for five years, with its term commencing when the new Landtag first meets. The election must be held in or before June 2022.

Electoral system
The Landtag is elected via mixed-member proportional representation. 35 members are elected in single-member constituencies via first-past-the-post voting. 34 members are then allocated using compensatory proportional representation. Voters have two votes: the "first vote" for candidates in single-member constituencies, and the "second vote" for party lists, which are used to fill the proportional seats. The minimum size of the Landtag is 69 members, but if overhang seats are present, proportional leveling seats will be added to ensure proportionality. An electoral threshold of 5% of valid votes is applied to the Landtag; parties that fall below this threshold, and fail to win at least one constituency, are ineligible to receive seats. Parties representing the Danish minority of Southern Schleswig and the Frisians, such as the South Schleswig Voters' Association, are exempt from the threshold.

Background

In the previous election held on 7 May 2017, the CDU remained the largest party with 32.0% of votes cast, an increase of 1.2 percentage points. The SPD lost three points and placed second with 27.3% of votes. The Greens won 12.9% (–0.3pp), the FDP won 11.5% (+3.3pp), and the SSW won 3.3% (–1.3pp). The AfD contested its first election in Schleswig-Holstein, winning 5.9%.

The SPD had led a coalition with the Greens and SSW since 2012, but this government lost its majority in the election. The CDU subsequently formed a coalition with the Greens and FDP, and Daniel Günther became Minister-President.

Parties
The table below lists parties represented in the 19th Landtag of Schleswig-Holstein.

Opinion polling

Graphical summary

Party polling

Results

Voter demographics and analysis

Government formation 
The CDU fell just one seat short of a majority in the Landtag and could form a coalition with any of the other parties. After the election, Minister-President Günther stated his intention to seek a renewal of the incumbent Jamaica coalition with both the Greens and FDP. On 19 May, he announced that exploratory talks had failed because neither of the smaller parties desired to continue a three-party coalition when only two parties were necessary for a majority. Four days later, the CDU extended an invitation to the Greens for coalition talks, which was accepted. As negotiations proceeded in early June, the two parties emphasised their mutual commitment to climate protection and social justice, and a rapid transition to renewable energy and climate neutrality. Agreement was also found in policy areas such as digitalisation and education, while they disagreed on security, agriculture, transport, and housing.

On 22 June, the CDU and Greens announced that they had finalised a coalition agreement. In the new cabinet, the number of ministers was increased by one as the agriculture portfolio will be split from that of environment and energy. The health ministry was also be transferred from the social affairs ministry to the justice ministry. Five ministers – economy, justice, education, interior, and agriculture – were allocated to the CDU and three to the Greens. Among them, Monika Heinold remained Deputy Minister-President and finance minister, while Tobias Goldschmidt became environment minister and Aminata Touré minister for social affairs. The agreement was approved overwhelmingly by both parties' congresses on 27 June, with the Greens recording four dissenting votes and the CDU none.

Daniel Günther was re-elected as Minister-President by the Landtag on 29 June, winning 47 votes out of 66 cast, including four abstentions.

References

2022 elections in Germany
2022 state election
2022
May 2022 events in Germany